= Apede =

Village in Maharashtra

- Village
- Interactive map of Apede
- Coordinates: 17.7869548°N 73.4258653°E
- Country: India
- State: Maharashtra

Apede is a small village in Ratnagiri district, Maharashtra state in Western India. The 2011 Census of India recorded 509 residents in the village. Apede's geographical area is approximately 478 hectares (1,180 acres).
